Crossing the Line (Korean: 푸른 눈의 평양시민, A Blue-Eyed Pyongyang Citizen in North Korea) is a 2006 British documentary film by Daniel Gordon and Nicholas Bonner.

Synopsis
The film is about a former U.S. Army soldier, James J. Dresnok, who defected to North Korea on 15 August 1962. It was directed and produced by British filmmakers Daniel Gordon and Nicholas Bonner, and was shown at the 2007 Sundance Film Festival. Crossing the Line, which was narrated by actor Christian Slater, was nominated for the Grand Jury Prize at the festival.

Production
It was first screened in 2007 on the BBC. The film centred on Dresnok's history, highlighting his unhappiness in America, and particularly his desertion from the United States Army in 1962 to the DPRK. It showed Dresnok in present-day in Pyongyang (where he lived to his death), interacting with his North Korean family and friends. Dresnok spoke exclusively to the filmmakers about his childhood, his desertion, his life in a country completely foreign and quite hostile to his own, his fellow defectors, and his wife and children.

Dresnok is shown with fellow defectors, including Charles Robert Jenkins, who returned to Japan to be with his wife, Hitomi Soga (a victim of kidnapping by the North Koreans), while filming was taking place. Dresnok seemed hurt by Jenkins' allegations of physical abuse by Dresnok and the North Korean regime and angrily denied them.

Towards the end of Crossing the Line, a North Korean doctor discloses to the BBC that Dresnok is in failing health, mainly due to heavy drinking and smoking.

Cast
James Joseph Dresnok
Charles Robert Jenkins
Christian Slater as narrator

Reception
The movie had mostly positive  reception.

References

External links

Crossing the Line on Rotten Tomatoes

2006 films
British documentary films
Documentary films about North Korea
2006 documentary films
2000s English-language films
2000s British films